Aspiring Air was an airline based in Wanaka, New Zealand. It operated charter pleasure flights around New Zealand's Southern Alps and scheduled services three times daily to Queenstown, connecting with Air New Zealand. Its main base was Wanaka Airport.

Code data 
IATA Code: OI

History

The airline was established in 1974, was wholly owned by Barrie McHaffie (Managing Director) and had 8 employees Aspiring Air started scheduled services from Wanaka to Christchurch in 1984 using a Cessna 207 aircraft. The flight took 90 minutes each way and had to be flown during daylight hours due to IFR rules. Later on a stop in Cromwell was added to the service. The airline was closed down on 7 July 2015.

Destinations 
Aspiring Air operated scheduled services between Wanaka and Queenstown (at March 2007).

Fleet 
In 1986 the Aspiring Air fleet consisted of two aircraft.

1 Cessna 207 Skywagon
1 Cessna A185F Skywagon

The Aspiring Air fleet consisted of the following aircraft in November 2012:

2 Britten-Norman BN2A Islander
1 Cessna 177 Cardinal
1 Cessna 172 Skyhawk

Accidents and incidents
On 8 August 1989, Nine passengers and the pilot died when the Britten-Norman Islander they were in crashed into terrain in the Upper Dart Valley.

See also
 List of defunct airlines of New Zealand
 History of aviation in New Zealand

References

External links
Aspiring Air 

Defunct airlines of New Zealand
Airlines established in 1974
Wānaka
New Zealand companies established in 1974
2015 disestablishments in New Zealand